The Europe/Africa Zone was one of the three zones of the regional Davis Cup competition in 2000.

In the Europe/Africa Zone there were four different tiers, called groups, in which teams competed against each other to advance to the upper tier. The top two teams in each Group IV sub-zone advanced to the Europe/Africa Zone Group III in 2000. All other teams remained in Group IV.

Participating nations

Draw
 Venue: Lugogo Tennis Club, Kampala, Uganda
 Date: 19–23 January

Group A

Group B

  and  promoted to Group III in 2001.

Group A

Zambia vs. San Marino

Zambia vs. Ethiopia

Namibia vs. San Marino

Namibia vs. Ethiopia

Namibia vs. Zambia

San Marino vs. Ethiopia

Group B

Cyprus vs. Lesotho

Kenya vs. Uganda

Cyprus vs. Kenya

Lesotho vs. Djibouti

Uganda vs. Djibouti

Kenya vs. Djibouti

Kenya vs. Lesotho

Cyprus vs. Djibouti

Lesotho vs. Uganda

Cyprus vs. Uganda

References

External links
Davis Cup official website

Davis Cup Europe/Africa Zone
Europe Africa Zone Group IV